Chicago's architecture is famous throughout the world and one style is referred to as the Chicago School. Much of its early work is also known as Commercial Style. In the history of architecture, the first Chicago School was a school of architects active in Chicago in the late 19th, and at the turn of the 20th century. They were among the first to promote the new technologies of steel-frame construction in commercial buildings, and developed a spatial aesthetic which co-evolved with, and then came to influence, parallel developments in European Modernism. A "Second Chicago School" with a modernist aesthetic emerged in the 1940s through 1970s, which pioneered new building technologies and structural systems, such as the tube-frame structure.

First Chicago School

While the term "Chicago School" is widely used to describe buildings constructed in the city during the 1880s and 1890s, this term has been disputed by scholars, in particular in reaction to Carl Condit's 1952 book The Chicago School of Architecture. Historians such as H. Allen Brooks, Winston Weisman and Daniel Bluestone have pointed out that the phrase suggests a unified set of aesthetic or conceptual precepts, when, in fact, Chicago buildings of the era displayed a wide variety of styles and techniques. Contemporary publications used the phrase "Commercial Style" to describe the innovative tall buildings of the era, rather than proposing any sort of unified "school."

Some of the distinguishing features of the Chicago School are the use of steel-frame buildings with masonry cladding (usually terra cotta), allowing large plate-glass window areas and limiting the amount of exterior ornamentation. Sometimes elements of neoclassical architecture are used in Chicago School skyscrapers. Many Chicago School skyscrapers contain the three parts of a classical column. The lowest floors functions as the base, the middle stories, usually with little ornamental detail, act as the shaft of the column, and the last floor or two, often capped with a cornice and often with more ornamental detail, represent the capital.

The "Chicago window" originated in this school. It is a three-part window consisting of a large fixed center panel flanked by two smaller double-hung sash windows. The arrangement of windows on the facade typically creates a grid pattern, with some projecting out from the facade forming bay windows. The Chicago window combined the functions of light-gathering and natural ventilation; a single central pane was usually fixed, while the two surrounding panes were operable. These windows were often deployed in bays, known as oriel windows, that projected out over the street.

Architects whose names are associated with the Chicago School include Henry Hobson Richardson, Dankmar Adler, Daniel Burnham, William Holabird, William LeBaron Jenney, Martin Roche, John Root, Solon S. Beman, and Louis Sullivan. Frank Lloyd Wright started in the firm of Adler and Sullivan but created his own Prairie Style of architecture.

The Home Insurance Building, which some regarded as the first skyscraper in the world, was built in Chicago in 1885 and was demolished in 1931.

Buildings in Chicago

Buildings outside Chicago

Second Chicago School

In the 1940s, a "Second Chicago School" emerged from the work of Ludwig Mies van der Rohe and his efforts of education at the Illinois Institute of Technology in Chicago. Mies sought to concentrate on neutral architectural forms instead of historicist ones, and the standard Miesian building is characterized by the presence of large glass panels and the use of steel for vertical and horizontal members.

The Second Chicago School's first and purest expression was the 860–880 Lake Shore Drive Apartments (1951) and their technological achievements. The structural engineer for the Lake Shore Drive Apartments project was Georgia Louise Harris Brown, who was the first African-American to receive an architecture degree from the University of Kansas, and second African-American woman to receive an architecture license in the United States. 

Skidmore, Owings & Merrill, a Chicago-based architectural firm, was the first to erect buildings conforming to the features of the Second Chicago School. Myron Goldsmith, Bruce Graham, Walter Netsch, and Fazlur Khan were among its most influential architects. The Bangladeshi-born structural engineer Khan introduced a new structural system of framed tubes in skyscraper design and construction. The tube structure, formed by closely spaced interconnected exterior columns, resists "lateral forces in any direction by cantilevering from the foundation." About half the exterior surface is available for windows. Where larger openings like garage doors are required, the tube frame must be interrupted, with transfer girders used to maintain structural integrity. The first building to apply the tube-frame construction was the DeWitt-Chestnut Apartment Building, which Khan designed and was completed in Chicago by 1963. This laid the foundations for the tube structures of many other later skyscrapers, including his own John Hancock Center and Willis Tower.

Today, there are different styles of architecture all throughout the city, such as the Chicago School, neo-classical, art deco, modern, and postmodern.

See also
Architecture of Chicago
Chicago Landmarks
Early Commercial architecture
Chicago Seven (architects)
Palazzo style architecture

References

Further reading

 Condit, Carl W. The Chicago school of architecture: a history of commercial and public building in the Chicago area, 1875-1925. University of Chicago Press, 1973.
 Leslie, Thomas. Chicago Skyscrapers, 1871-1934. University of Illinois Press, 2013.

 
American architectural styles
Architecture in Illinois
Architecture in Chicago
19th century in Chicago